National Highway 23 (NH 23) is a primary national highway in India. NH-23 runs in an east-west direction, entirely in the state of Rajasthan.

Route 

NH23 connects Kothun, Lalsot, Karauli, Bari and Dhaulpur in the state of Rajasthan.

Junctions  
 
  Terminal near Kothun.
  near Lalsot
  near Lalsot
  near Dholpur
  Terminal near Dhaulpur.

See also 
 List of National Highways in India
 List of National Highways in India by state

References

External links 

 NH 23 on OpenStreetMap

National highways in India
National Highways in Rajasthan